Rockland Road Bridge is a historic stone and brick arch bridge located at Piermont in Rockland County, New York. It was built in 1874 and spans Sparkill Creek, a tributary of the Hudson River. The bridge is located southwest of the Sparkill Creek Drawbridge.

It was listed on the National Register of Historic Places in 2005.

References

Road bridges on the National Register of Historic Places in New York (state)
Bridges completed in 1874
Transportation buildings and structures in Rockland County, New York
National Register of Historic Places in Rockland County, New York
Brick bridges in the United States
Stone arch bridges in the United States